James C. Fields Jr. is an American civil servant and minister in the United Methodist Church who served in the Alabama House of Representatives from 2008 until 2010. A native of Colony, Alabama, Fields was the first African American to be a candidate for elective office in Cullman County, Alabama, which is predominantly white.

Early life and education
James Fields grew up on his family's small farm in Colony. After graduating from Hanceville High School, he attended Jacksonville State University, where he obtained a bachelor's degree in law enforcement.

Military service
Subsequently, he served in the U.S. Marines, attending officer training at the Marine Corps Academy in Quantico, Virginia, and leaving with an honorable discharge.

Alabama House of Representatives
James Fields was elected as a Democratic member of the Alabama House of Representatives in a special election on January 29, 2008. He was defeated for reelection in 2010 by fellow Methodist minister Mac Buttram.

Personal life
James Fields and his wife Yvette have seven children and 13 grandchildren.

James Fields has worked for the Alabama Department of Industrial Relations for nearly three decades and is a minister at St. James United Methodist Church in Irondale, Alabama.

Elections
In November 2013, James Fields announced that he would be a candidate for Lieutenant Governor of Alabama in the 2014 elections. He ran in the Democratic primary uncontested and was defeated by incumbent Republican Lieutenant Governor Kay Ivey in the general election.

Electoral history

References

External links
 Fields for Lieutenant Governor

African-American Methodist clergy
American Methodist clergy
American civil servants
Living people
Democratic Party members of the Alabama House of Representatives
People from Cullman County, Alabama
Year of birth missing (living people)
People from Hanceville, Alabama
People from Irondale, Alabama
American United Methodist clergy
African-American state legislators in Alabama
21st-century African-American people